The following individuals have started in games at the quarterback position for the California Golden Bears football team, updated from 1961 through 2019.

References

External links
 California Golden Bears on Sports-Reference.com

Lists of college football quarterbacks
University of California-related lists
California Golden Bears quarterbacks